Octadecanol may refer to:

 Stearyl alcohol (1-octadecanol, C18H38O), a saturated fatty alcohol
 Oleyl alcohol (cis-9-octadecen-1-ol, C18H36O), an unsaturated fatty alcohol